Eric Wendell Wilson (born October 17, 1962) is a former American football linebacker. He played college football at Maryland and was drafted in the seventh round of the 1985 NFL Draft by the Green Bay Packers. He also played for the Buffalo Bills and the Washington Redskins.

1962 births
Living people
American football linebackers
Buffalo Bills players
Maryland Terrapins football players
Washington Redskins players
Sportspeople from Charlottesville, Virginia